Kristine Sharashidze (1887 — 1973) was a Georgian politician, active in the Democratic Republic of Georgia and its Constituent Assembly.

References
 Kristine Sharashidze at the Georgian National Center of Manuscripts

1887 births
1973 deaths
Democratic Republic of Georgia
Mensheviks
People from Kutais Governorate
20th-century women politicians from Georgia (country)
20th-century politicians from Georgia (country)